Alif Iskandar (born 16 March 1999) is a Singaporean footballer currently playing as a defender for Young Lions.

Career statistics

Club

Notes

References

1999 births
Living people
Singaporean footballers
Association football defenders
Singapore Premier League players
Hougang United FC players
Young Lions FC players
Singapore youth international footballers